Mount Gimie is the tallest mountain on the island of Saint Lucia. It is located in the Canries District on the west side of Saint Lucia.  The mountain's peak reaches . It is covered by lush tropical rainforest and was formed as the result of intense volcanic activity 200,000 to 300,000 years ago. Mount Gimie is still volcanic and so are many other of the Pitons (a couple of volcanic plugs in which Mount Gimie belongs).

References

Mountains of Saint Lucia
Highest points of countries
Volcanoes of Saint Lucia